Route 126 or Highway 126 can refer to multiple roads:

Canada
 New Brunswick Route 126
 Ontario Highway 126 (former)
 Prince Edward Island Route 126

Costa Rica
 National Route 126

Japan
 Japan National Route 126

United States
  Interstate 126
  U.S. Route 126 (former)
  Alabama State Route 126
  Arkansas Highway 126
  California State Route 126
  Connecticut Route 126
  Florida State Road 126
  Georgia State Route 126
  Illinois Route 126
  Indiana State Road 126 (former)
  Iowa Highway 126 (former)
  K-126 (Kansas highway)
  Kentucky Route 126
  Louisiana Highway 126
  Maine State Route 126
  Maryland Route 126 (former)
  Massachusetts Route 126
  M-126 (Michigan highway) (former)
  Missouri Route 126
  New Hampshire Route 126
  County Route 126 (Bergen County, New Jersey)
  New Mexico State Road 126
  New York State Route 126
  County Route 126 (Herkimer County, New York)
  County Route 126 (Montgomery County, New York)
  County Route 126 (Niagara County, New York)
  County Route 126 (Onondaga County, New York)
  County Route 126 (Rensselaer County, New York)
  County Route 126 (Seneca County, New York)
  County Route 126 (Tompkins County, New York)
  North Carolina Highway 126
  Ohio State Route 126
  Oklahoma State Highway 126 (former)
  Oregon Route 126
  Pennsylvania Route 126 (former)
  Rhode Island Route 126
  South Carolina Highway 126
  Tennessee State Route 126
  Texas State Highway 126 (former)
  Texas State Highway Spur 126
  Farm to Market Road 126
  Utah State Route 126
  Virginia State Route 126
  Virginia State Route 126 (1928-1933) (former)
  Virginia State Route 126 (1933-1944) (former)
  Washington State Route 126 (former)
  Wisconsin Highway 126